Ferrol en Común (Ferrol in Common or Ferrol Together, FeC) is a grassroots movement and political coalition in the city of Ferrol, Galicia whose goal is to build a left-wing and participative political electoral alliance. FeC is supported by political parties like Anova-Nationalist Brotherhood (Anova-IN), United Left (EU) and the local circle of Podemos in the city of Ferrol.

History
Jorge Suárez, a member of United Left, was elected as the candidate for the 2015 local elections. FeC was the second most voted party in said elections (7,142 votes, 21.98%), winning 6 seats in the city council. Suárez was elected as mayor, with the votes of FeC, the Socialists' Party of Galicia (PSdeG-PSOE) and the Galician Nationalist Bloc (BNG).

In the 2019 local elections FeC won only 3 councillors and lost the mayorship of the city to Ángel Mato (PSdeG-PSOE).

Councillors (2019-2023)
 Jorge Juan Suárez Fernández: Law graduate and civil servant. Member of United Left of Galicia and mayor of the city from 2015 to 2019.
 Xiana López Penedo: Worker of the Psychiatry Service in the Public Healthcare System of Galicia. Member of both Anova-IN and the Galician People's Front (FPG). In the Galician elections of 2009 she was the top candidate of the FPG in the province of A Coruña.
 Suso Basterrechea López: Graduate in Fine Arts, plastic artist and high school teacher. He was the city councillor of culture between 2015 and 2019.

Electoral results

See also
 Compostela Aberta
 Marea de Pontevedra
 Marea de Vigo
 Marea Atlántica

References

External links
Official website
Official Twitter

2015 establishments in Galicia (Spain)
Podemos (Spanish political party)
Political parties established in 2015
Political parties in Galicia (Spain)
Political party alliances in Spain
Socialist parties in Galicia (Spain)
United Left (Spain)